Dorcadion borisi is a species of beetle in the family Cerambycidae. It was described by Heyrovsky in 1931. It is known from Macedonia.

References

borisi
Beetles described in 1931